was a Japanese screenwriter who first began his career during the "revolutionary era" of Japanese animation on Mach GoGoGo (Speed Racer), Science Ninja Team Gatchaman (Battle of the Planets/G-Force), and Yatterman.

Toriumi was born in the northern Japanese prefecture of Hokkaidō. After trying his hand at live-action at Nikkatsu,  he began writing animation scripts at Mushi Productions for Mighty Atom (Astro Boy) in 1964. He went on to devote himself full-time to television at Tatsunoko Production in 1965. He contributed to Casshern, Tekkaman and Time Bokan. He later began writing for such Sunrise works as Armored Trooper VOTOMS, Yoroiden Samurai Troopers (Ronin Warriors), Mister Ajikko. He also wrote the novel versions of Gatchaman, Shin Heiyōden and Dororo, as well as the Anime Scenario Nyūmon (The Introduction to Anime Scriptwriting).

He used the Anime Scenario Nyūmon book when he became a vocational school teacher for future generations of scriptwriters. He also chaired Ohtori Koubou, a support organization for scriptwriters. He received the (Scenario) Scriptwriting Award from the Japan Writers Guild on May 26, 2000.

Death
On January 17, 2008, he succumbed to liver cancer in a Tokyo hospital, aged 78. He was survived by his wife, Kazuyo.

Filmography

Television
 series planner/head writer denoted in bold
 Astro Boy (1965)
 Space Ace (1965-1966)
 Sally the Witch (1967-1968)
 Oraa Guzura Dado (1967-1968)
 Speed Racer (1967-1968)
 Himitsu no Akko-chan (1969)
 Judo Boy (1969)
 The Adventures of Hutch the Honeybee (1970-1971)
 Inakappe Taishō (1970-1972)
 Animentary: The Decision (1971)
 Science Ninja Team Gatchaman (1972)
 Pinocchio: The Series (1972)
 Tamagon the Counselor (1972-1973)
 Demetan Croaker, The Boy Frog (1973)
 Casshan (1973-1974)
 New Honeybee Hutch (1974)
 Urikupen Kyūjotai (1974-1975)
 Tekkaman: The Space Knight (1975)
 Time Bokan (1975-1976)
 Gowappa 5 Gōdam (1976)
 Paul’s Miraculous Adventure (1976-1977)
 Temple the Balloonist (1977-1978)
 Yatterman (1977-1979)
 Uchū Majin Daikengo (1978-1979)
 Gatchaman II (1978-1979)
 Gatchaman Fighter (1979-1980)
 Zenderman (1979-1980)
 Space Warrior Baldios (1980)
 Zukkoke Knight - Don De La Mancha (1980)
 Anime Yasei no Sakebi (1982)
Armored Trooper Votoms (1983-1984)
 Super Dimension Cavalry Southern Cross (1984)
Panzer World Galient (1984-1985)
Oraa Guzura Dado (1987-1988)
Ronin Warriors (1988-1989)
 Mister Ajikko (1988-1989): eps 70-99
The Adventures of Hutch the Honeybee (1989-1990)
 Yokoyama Mitsuteru Sangokushi (1991-1992)
 Jungle King Tar-chan (1993-1994)
 Ginga Sengoku Gun'yūden Rai (1994-1995)

Film
 Science Ninja Team Gatchaman: The Movie (1978)

OVA
 Kentauros no Densetsu (1987)

References

External links

Ohtori-koubou.com
指定された記事またはカテゴリは表示できませんでした
Animeanime.jp

1929 births
2008 deaths
Anime screenwriters
Deaths from liver cancer
People from Hokkaido
People from Tokyo
Deaths from cancer in Japan
Tatsunoko Production people
20th-century Japanese screenwriters